Kampong Jaya Bakti is a village in Brunei-Muara District, Brunei, and a neighbourhood in the capital Bandar Seri Begawan. The population was 468 in 2016. It is one of the villages within Mukim Berakas 'A'. The postcode is BB3113.

References 

Neighbourhoods in Bandar Seri Begawan
Villages in Brunei-Muara District